Tai Lue or Tai Lü may refer to:

Tai Lue language
Tai Lue people

See also
New Tai Lue (disambiguation)